Adelmo Achito Vivas (born 1 March 1934 in Buenaventura) is a retired Colombian international footballer. He competed for the Colombia national football team at the 1962 FIFA World Cup which was held in Chile.

Vivas spend most of his career playing for Deportivo Pereira, appearing in 220 league matches for the club.

References

External links
 Achito Vivas at BDFA.com.ar 

1934 births
Living people
Colombian footballers
Colombia international footballers
1962 FIFA World Cup players
Atlético Nacional footballers
Deportivo Pereira footballers
Atlético Junior footballers
Deportes Tolima footballers
Deportes Quindío footballers
Once Caldas footballers
Categoría Primera A players
Association football goalkeepers
People from Buenaventura, Valle del Cauca
Sportspeople from Valle del Cauca Department